Arlington High School is a public high school located in Arlington, Massachusetts.  As of 2010, the school enrolls approximately 1,300 students annually.  The current principal is Matthew Janger. Currently being rebuilt.

History

The current Arlington High School, designed by Howard B.S. Prescott, was opened in 1915 for grades 10–12.  What is now known as "Fusco house" was the only original building. Boys and girls were required to enter the building through two separate entrances. Two additions were later added on, the "Collomb house," as it is now known, in 1937 and then the "Downs house."

Peirce Field, an outdoor field for football, soccer, track, field hockey, lacrosse, baseball and softball, was created by filling in "Cutter's Pond", which had been previously used for milling. Mill Brook still runs underneath the high school to this day. The field was renovated in 2004 due to toxin levels in the soil. This toxicity stemmed from a company located where the Department of Public Works is currently situated.  A settlement was reached with the company to pay for the entire cleaning, capping, and renovation.

In 2010, Arlington High School became a national news over a School Committee vote regarding the Pledge of Allegiance. The following year in 2011, interim principal Mary Villano suspended school dances because of drinking and inappropriate dancing.

Notable alumni
Peter Zebbler Berdovsky, VJ, artist
Paul Boudreau, NFL Offensive Line Coach
Dane Cook, Comedian
Jim Driscoll, former MLB player (Oakland Athletics, Texas Rangers)
Olympia Dukakis, Oscar-Winning Actress
Liam Ezekiel, former NFL and UFL player
Sean Garballey, Massachusetts State Representative
Alan Hovhaness, Composer
John A. Kelley, 2-Time Boston Marathon Winner
Chris Leary, actor, Once Around, Celtic Pride, Edge of Darkness, The Fighter
Elaine J. McCarthy Projection and Scenic Designer for Broadway and Opera
John Messuri, hockey player and coach
Mark Preston, CNN Senior Political Analyst and Executive Editor, CNN Politics
Louis W. Ross, architect
Dave "Chico" Ryan, musician
Carl Sumner, Former MLB player (Boston Red Sox)
Alan "Blind Owl" Wilson, guitarist/songwriter of Canned Heat
Miles Robinson, professional soccer player

References

External links

Arlington High School website

Buildings and structures in Arlington, Massachusetts
Schools in Middlesex County, Massachusetts
Public high schools in Massachusetts
1915 establishments in Massachusetts